Hilarographa meekana is a species of moth of the family Tortricidae. It is found on Fergusson Island in Papua New Guinea.

The wingspan is about 18.5 mm. The ground colour of the forewings is greyish white suffused with brownish, represented by diffuse lines extending from the dorsum except for the basal area and five costal lines. The hindwings are transparent with a dark brown periphery and scaled veins of pale parts.

References

Moths described in 2009
Hilarographini